Crandall is a Scottish surname.

Crandall may also refer to:

Places
 Crandall, Georgia, U.S.
 Crandall, Indiana, U.S.
 Crandall, South Dakota, U.S.
 Crandall, Texas, U.S.
 Crandall Peak, Victoria Land, Antarctica

Other uses
 Crandall University, Canada
 Crandall cabs, a B–unit locomotive conversion
 Crandall syndrome, rare congenital disorder

See also

 Crandall House (disambiguation)
 Crandell (disambiguation)
 Crannell (disambiguation)
 Crendell, a hamlet in Dorset, England
 Crandall v. Nevada, a U.S. Supreme court case